Dedication and Everlasting Love to Animals Rescue (D.E.L.T.A. Rescue) is an animal welfare organization based in Acton, California, US. With more than 1,500 animals on the property, it is the largest animal rescue of its type in the world. Actor/producer/animal welfare activist Leo Grillo is its national president and founder. As of 2007, the organization is funded solely on private donations of more than $5.5 million per year.

History

In 1979, while driving to Bakersfield, California, Grillo rescued a black doberman which had been abandoned in the Angeles National Forest. He named the dog Delta, the first of thousands of animals Grillo made it his mission to save. A few months after rescuing his organization's namesake, Grillo discovered a few dozen more castaways during another outing to the forest. He brought them to his family home, which drew the ire of neighbors. Grillo purchased and renovated a condemned kennel for the animals and moved it to his present site in Acton.

In 1989, Grillo set the first traps in a campaign to remove feral cats that for decades had lived on the beachfront rocks along the promenade outside Holiday Inn in Ventura. He received an endorsement of the move from the state Parks and Recreation Department, which controls San Buenaventura State Beach. Grillo said the two dozen cats he rescued were remnants of a sick and dying colony that at one time numbered about 100.

D.E.L.T.A. Rescue is the only organization in America that rescues animals abandoned in the wilderness. It carries a care-for-life policy and does not put its animals up for adoption to assure their safety and longevity.

Guarded location

The sanctuary is located mountaintop in the dry and rugged Sierra Pelona Mountains with no sign at the gate. A security guard watches the entrance 24 hours a day. On rare exceptions, tours are held for donors three times each year. Otherwise, no visitors are allowed.

Housing

The dogs are paired off in hundreds of yards with stucco dwellings, wading pools and shade coverings. Hundreds of feral or previously abused and abandoned felines live in more than 40 indoor/outdoor catteries.

Straw bale dog house

Grillo's more successful housing idea has been a re-discovery of combining straw bales and stucco. The structures are also waterproof. Grillo's eco-friendly straw bale construction technique has been promoted by such animal rights activists worldwide as Maneka Gandhi.

Medical advancement

In association with a physician at UC Davis Veterinary Medical Center, D.E.L.T.A. Rescue established the world's first kidney dialysis center for dogs and cats. D.E.L.T.A. Rescue has a total of two state-of-the-art hospitals that include dog and cat intensive care units, physical therapy and rehabilitation, deep-tissue ultrasound, electrostimulation, treadmill and hydrotherapy. "There are no restrictions on practicing medicine. We treat each animal like a person," said Grillo. "[We keep] them comfortable at all times. Heart disease, geriatrics, cancer, kidney disease and other chronic illness are treated here." D.E.L.T.A. Rescue chief veterinarian Dr. Gaylord Brown says he has no idea how much the medical care costs. "The nice thing about it is, I honestly don't have to worry about that," Brown said. "Leo says, 'You tell me what needs to be done and I'll get out there and see that it happens.'"

Animal dialysis

To date, the UC Davis Veterinary School has provided dialysis treatments numbering in the thousands to hundreds of dogs and cats which probably would have otherwise had only days to live. The procedure has saved roughly half of the animals, said UC Davis professor Dr. Larry Cowgill. "The contributions that Leo [Grillo] has made have been instrumental in making animal dialysis a reality today," said Cowgill.

Horse Rescue of America

The D.E.L.T.A. Rescue sanctuary is home to Horse Rescue of America, which houses more than 30 previously forsaken horses. It was established in 1988 for the purpose of saving the lives of wild horses and burros slated for wholesale slaughter in North America. In 2007, a bill was introduced to the 110th Congress aimed at restoring prohibition on the commercial sale and slaughter of wild, free-roaming horses and burros. This bill has not become law.

2009 California Wildfires

On August 30, 2009, the safety of the D.E.L.T.A. Rescue sanctuary was threatened when a nearby wildfire became treacherous. The arson fire started in La Cañada-Flintridge. Two firefighters were killed after the blaze moved in three directions. During a broadcast on KNX radio, Leo Grillo pleaded for an air assault. On September 28, 2009, Grillo distributed a nationwide press release, calling for a federal probe into circumstances that led up to the blaze. Grillo blamed a lack of air support for the wildfire, which became the largest blaze in the modern-day history of Los Angeles County. "[The United States Forest Service] had the golden opportunity to put it out and they didn't," Grillo said.

On 30 September 2009, U.S. Forest Service officials announced a review of the initial multi-agency response to the  Station Fire amid complaints from Grillo and other residents that the early firefighting effort was poor. In a signed statement on this same day, Arnold Schwarzenegger, Governor of California, applauded the probe. The United States Forest Service administers the nation's 155 national forests.

Video shows staff and USFS during this sand fire of 2016

Congressional matters
In 2009, Grillo brought the idea of a pet tax exemption to the attention of fellow actor Robert Davi. Davi took Grillo's proposal to Thaddeus McCotter, a Republican who represents Michigan's 11th congressional district in the U.S. House of Representatives. McCotter introduced HR 3501, the Humanity and Pets Partnered Through the Years Act, or HAPPY Act, to Congress in July 2009. HR 3501 is a bill that will allow taxpayers to deduct pet-related expenses from their income taxes.

References

Further reading
 
 
 

Animal shelters in the United States
Charities based in California
Animal charities based in the United States
Animal rescue groups
Dog welfare organizations